Arthur Blake (November 7, 1929,  Washington, Tyne and Wear – November 27, 2001, Kensington, London, England) was an English actor who appeared in British television and film from the 1950s through the 1990s.

Filmography

Film
Quatermass 2 (1957)
Girl Stroke Boy (1971)
Male Bait (1971)
The Cherry Picker (1974)
Little Dorrit (1987)

Television

Saturday Playhouse (1959)
 No Hiding Place (1959-1961)
ITV Television Playhouse (1961)
Z-Cars (1962)
The Dickie Henderson Show (1963-1965)
Crane (1965)
Doctor Who (1965)
Frontier (1968)
Crime Buster (1968)
Theatre Date (1969)
World in Ferment (1969)
Budgie (1971)
ITV Sunday Night Theatre (1971)
Hine (1971)
Bel Ami (1971)
War and Peace (1972)
The Edwardians (1972)
Heil Caesar! (1973)
Thursday's Child (1973)
The Stars Look Down (1975)
Red Letter Day (1976)
Striker (1976)
Headmaster (1977)
Armchair Thriller (1978)
The Professionals (1978)
Born and Bred (1980)
Strangers (1980)
When the Boat Comes In (1981)
BBC2 Playhouse (1981) 
Funny Man (1981)
Holding the Fort (1982)
The Agatha Christie Hour (1982)
The World About Us  (1982)
Rumpole of the Bailey (1983-1988)
Mr. Palfrey of Westminster (1984)
Bergerac (1985)
Murder of a Moderate Man (1985)
Sorry! (1986)
First Among Equals (1986)
The Bill (1986-1989)
 A Dorothy L. Sayers Mystery (1987)
Don't Wait Up (1988)
Double First (1988)
Star Trap (1988)
London's Burning (1989)
Campion (1990)
Unnatural Causes (1993)
Under the Hammer (1994)
No Bananas (1996)

References

External links

1929 births
2001 deaths
English male film actors
English male television actors